François Desrochers is a politician and teacher from Quebec, Canada. He was an Action démocratique du Québec Member of the National Assembly for the electoral district of Mirabel from 2007 to 2008.

Desrochers hold a bachelor's degree in secondary teaching from the Université du Québec à Montréal and is currently doing a master's degree in the same domain at the Université de Sherbrooke Before his election, Desrochers was a public school teacher for nine years in human sciences and was an assistant principal at École secondaire des Patriotes in Saint-Eustache.

Desrochers was first elected for the ADQ (which he was a member since 1995) in the 2007 election with 44% of the vote. Parti Québécois incumbent Denise Beaudoin finished second with 34% of the vote.  Desrochers took office on April 12, 2007.  On April 19, 2007, he was selected to be the Official Opposition's Shadow Minister of Education.

Electoral record

Federal

Provincial

Footnotes

External links
 

Action démocratique du Québec MNAs
Living people
Université de Sherbrooke alumni
Université du Québec à Montréal alumni
Year of birth missing (living people)
21st-century Canadian politicians